The Norman Conquest was the 11th-century invasion and occupation of England by an army led by William the Conqueror.

Norman conquest or Norman invasion may also refer to:

Invasions by Normans
Norman conquest of southern Italy, 999 to 1139
Byzantine–Norman wars
Norman invasion of Wales
Norman invasion of Malta, 1091
Norman Kingdom of Africa
Anglo-Norman invasion of Ireland (began 1169)

Invasions of Normandy

The Invasion of Normandy beginning with D-Day was a successful Allied landing operation in 1944 into northern France from England during World War II.

Other uses
Norman Conquest (soccer) (1916–1968), Australian soccer goalkeeper
Norman Conquest (film), a 1953 film
The Norman Conquests, a 1973 trilogy of plays by Alan Ayckbourn
Harold or the Norman Conquest, 1895 opera by Frederic H. Cowen and Edward Malet
Norman Conquest, a mystery novel series by Edwy Searles Brooks

See also
Normans#Conquests and military offensives